Language exchange is a method of language learning based on mutual language practicing by learning partners who are speakers of different languages. This is usually done by two native speakers teaching each other their native language. Language exchange is different from other Language learning methods as there is usually no set syllabus or activities. Language exchange is sometimes called Tandem language learning.

In modern contexts, "language exchange" most often refers to the mutual teaching of partners' first languages.  Language exchanges are generally considered helpful for developing language proficiency, especially in speaking fluency and listening comprehension.  Language exchanges that take place through writing or text chats also improve reading comprehension and writing ability. The aim of language exchange is to develop and increase language knowledge and intercultural skills. This is usually done through social interaction with the native speaker. Given that language exchanges generally take place between native speakers of different languages, there is also the side benefit of improving cross-cultural communication.

History
This practice has long been used by individuals to exchange knowledge of foreign languages. For example, John Milton gave Roger Williams an opportunity to practice Hebrew, Greek, Latin, and French, while receiving lessons in Dutch in exchange. Language exchange first came about in the early 1800s where school aged children in England were introduced to the newly set up program. Countries such as Belgium and Switzerland found the language exchange program very easy to run as there were many languages spoken in the one country. French and German youth picked up language exchange in 1968 which then spread to Turkey and Madrid.

In education
Universities are increasingly experimenting with language exchanges as part of the language learning curriculum.  In this respect, language exchanges have a similar role as study abroad programs and language immersion programs in creating an environment where the language student must use the foreign language for genuine communication outside of a classroom setting. Language Travelling has increased significantly over the last three years, with an increase of 67%. However, there are also concerns that language exchanges cannot be used as a substitute for formal language education, given the difficulty of using language exchanges in learning formal grammar and writing skills.

In addition, various offline organizations exist to facilitate language exchanges, such as Tandem language learning and Unilang, as well as mobile apps like uTandem and Tandem.
 
By using the mobile apps, users from all over the world can connect with new language partners to share connections and passions. 
Some of the apps will connect you based on interests, location or just with a native speaker of the language you are searching for.

Institutional programs
In Europe, the Erasmus programme (established in 1987 by the European Union and incorporated in the Socrates programme in 1994) allows students to do part of their studies in another European institution. The students will be studying for a minimum of three months, up to one year.

In Canada, the Katimavik programme is addressed to young volunteers aged 17 to 21; This program has cultural aims and allows them to practice the second official language in three Canadian provinces.

In Spain, the fields of education and training have increased language tourism by more than 20% between 2007 and 2009.

LAOTSE (Links to Asia by Organizing Traineeship and Student Exchange) is an international network of technical universities from Europe to Asia.

Benefits 
Language exchanges have been viewed as a helpful tool to aid language learning at language schools.  Language exchanges tend to benefit oral proficiency, fluency, colloquial vocabulary acquisition, and vernacular usage. A major benefit of language exchange is the exposure to the native speaker's culture. Understanding the culture of native speaker will help with understanding why and how the language is used. Another benefit is that you are in an friendly and informal environment, this means there is no pressure to get everything right as both speakers are trying to learn and understand. This also gives the learning environment a fun and productive atmosphere. By learning with native speakers each person will get a better understanding of the language as they are learning from someone who has knowledge and background in the language, whereas, learning from someone who has learnt the language later on in their life may not be correct in what they are teaching.
Another benefit is that people are learning faster when they have a one-on-one connection with the "teacher". Many people choose to learn one-on-one but struggle try to find a teacher. People like this are highly motivated to learn a new language. The native speakers who are helping these people may feel a new sense of motivation since they are now responsible for teaching this person.

Technology
With the growth of the internet, language exchanges using social networks and voice-over-IP technologies have become increasingly popular.  Language learning social networks, such as HelloTalk and Tandem, now offer students the ability to find language partners around the world, and speak, text chat or video through instant messengers.  This has allowed students who previously could not find foreign language partners to search online for native speakers of that language.
Another perk of this technology is that users can verify their texts with native speakers. This way there will be less grammar mistakes and bigger improvements in languages. There are now over 24 different online language exchange groups that can be joined.

See also
Language education
Community language learning
Language immersion
Language acquisition
Communicative language teaching
Online learning community

References

Language exchange programs
Student exchange
Peer learning